By the Hand of the Father is a collection of songs from the play By the Hand of the Father, by Alejandro Escovedo, released in 2002.

Track listing 
All tracks composed by Alejandro Escovedo; except where indicated
 "By the Hand of the Father Theme" – 2:57
 "Wave" – 5:27
 "Did You Tell Me?" (Gabriel Tenorio, Guillermo Rios, Quetzal Flores) – 3:36
 "Dos Hermanos/Two Brothers" – 2:35
 "Ballad of the Sun and the Moon" – 5:37
 "Mexico Americano" (Rumel Fuentes) – 2:52
 "Seven Years" – :46
 "Rosalie" – 5:36
 "Hard Road" (Javier Escovedo) – 4:23
 "59 Years" (Brian Standefer) – 2:05
 "Inside This Dance" (Alejandro Escovedo, J. Steven Soles) – 4:51
 "Cancion Mixteca" (Jose Lopez Alvaez) – 5:05
 "With These Hands" - 4:43
 "Silence" - 6:40
 "And Yet/Theme" - 4:38

Personnel 
 Elliott Baribeault - Bass, Bajo Sexto, Backup Vocal
 Alejandro Escovedo - Guitar, Vocals, Liner Notes
 Pete Escovedo - Percussion
 Quetzal Flores - Bajo Sexto
 Rosie Flores - Vocals
 Larry Hirsch - Engineer, Mastering, Mixing
 Otoño Lujan - Accordion
 Rocío Marron - Violin
 Hector Muñoz - Percussion
 Doug Pettibone - Electric Guitar, Steel Guitar, Slide Guitar, Hi String Guitar
 Rubén Ramos - Vocals, Voiceover
 César Rosas - Vocals
 J. Steven Soles - Bass, Piano, Vocals, Producer
 Gabriel Tenorio - Electric Guitar, Hi String Guitar, Requinto

References 

Alejandro Escovedo albums
2002 albums